The Genoa Social Forum is a coalition of movements, political parties and societies opposed to capitalist globalisation.  It was created in 2000, a year before the scheduled 27th G8 summit in Genoa in 2001, and included several associations - and hundreds of smaller ones - largely but not solely from Italy.  Although it made several requests to meet the institutional representatives, as a forerunner of a counter-forum, on June 24, 2001 they were met by police chief Gianni De Gennaro.  Its national spokesperson was Vittorio Agnoletto, former MEP for the Communist Refoundation Party.

National adherents to the GSF

ACM - Associazione Culturale Mignanego
Altrimondi
ARCI Associazione Libriamo
ARCI Circolo Mascherona 16
ARCI Genova
Arciragazzi
Associazione Agire Politicamente
Associazione Città Aperta
Associazione Comunità Papa Giovanni XXIII Liguria
Associazione Gay-Lesbica Liberi Tutti
Associazione Giuristi Democratici
Associazione Medici per l'Ambiente - ISDE
Associazione per il Rinnovamento della Sinistra
Associazione Pimpiripetta
AYUSYA
Bambini Vittime
Banca Etica - Circoscrizione Locale di Genova e Imperia
CEDRITT
Centro Cooperazione Sviluppo
Chiesa Evangelica Metodista
Chiesa Evangelica Valdese di Sampierdarena
COGEDE
Comunità di San Benedetto al Porto
Consorzio Sociale Agorà
COSPE
Centro Sociale Talpa e Orologio
CSOA Emiliano Zapata
CSOA Terra di Nessuno
Federazione Chiese Evangeliche Liguria
Federazione dei Giovani Socialisti
Federazione Giovanile Comunisti Italiani
Federazione Regionale Solidarietà e Lavoro
Federazione Impiegati Operai Metallurgici - Fiom
Giovani Comunisti
ICS - Consorzio Italiano di Solidarietà
Il Ce.sto
ISCOS CISL Liguria
La Rete per il Partito Democratico Liguria
Lavoratori della Libreria Feltrinelli
Lavoro Società - Cambiare Rotta - CGIL
Legacoop Liguria - Comparto Cooperative Sociali
Legambiente Circolo Nuova Ecologia
Legambiente Regionale Liguria
LILA
LOC - Lega degli obiettori di coscienza
Macondo
Mani Tese
Marea
MLAL - Movimento Laici America Latina
Movimento Federalista Europeo
Partito della Rifondazione Comunista
Partito della Rifondazione Comunista - Forum Donne
Partito Umanista
Planet
Progetto Continenti
RdB - Rappresentanze di Base as an adherent of the CUB
RdB - Rappresentanze di Base as an adherent of the CUB delegati INPS
Rete ControG8
Rete Lilliput
Rappresentati Sindacali Unitari
Sinistra Giovanile
Sondagenova
Suore del Buon Pastore
Time for Peace - Gruppo di Solidarietà Camogli
UISP
Ya Basta!

Political movements